The 2018 FIA European Truck Racing Championship was a motor-racing championship using highly tuned tractor units. It was the 34th year of the championship. Jochen Hahn took his fifth victory in the championship driving an Iveco.

Teams and drivers

Calendar and winners

Championship standings

Drivers' Championship

Each round or racing event consisted of four races. At each race, points were awarded to the top ten classified finishers using the following structure:

References

External links
Official website

European Truck Racing Championship seasons
European Truck Racing Championship
Truck Racing Championship